Einar Hammarsten (January 4, 1889 in Norrköping - February 16, 1968 in Solna) was a Swedish physician and professor of pharmacy and chemistry at the Karolinska Institute from 1928 to 1957. His area of research was the chemistry of the cell nucleus, in particular nucleic acids.

Hammarsten was the first to discover that RNA, at that time called the tetranucleotide of yeast nucleic acid, is present in animal organs, or more specifically in the pancreas. Before Hammarsten's discovery, only guanylic acid had been found there. His doctoral dissertation in 1924 was concerned with purification of DNA, at the time called thymonucleic acid, its ionization and osmotic pressure.

Hammarsten was elected to the Royal Swedish Academy of Sciences in 1937. He was a member of the Nobel Committee for Physiology or Medicine, and was himself nominated for a Nobel Prize in Physiology or Medicine in 1941.

In 1918, Hammarsten married Greta Norrbin, a clinical chemistry and medical doctor at the Karolinska Institute in Stockholm.

References 

1889 births
1968 deaths
Swedish physicians
Swedish chemists
Academic staff of the Karolinska Institute
Members of the Royal Swedish Academy of Sciences